Champagne Ladies and Blue Ribbon Babies  is an album by American country music singer Ferlin Husky, released in 1974 by ABC Records. The album reached #43 in the US Country Charts. The title track single "Champagne Ladies and Blue Ribbon Babies" reached #34 in the US Country Charts and the single of "Burning" reached #37. These were his last chart-making singles. "Wings of a Dove," a gospel song, was a No. 1 country hit in 1960 and was one of his signature songs.

Track listing
Side A
"Champagne Ladies and Blue Ribbon Babies" (Dallas Frazier, A.L. "Doodle" Owens) – 2:41
"How Is Your Love Life" (Troy Shondell, Chuck Wadley) – 2:27
"Wings of a Dove" (Bob Ferguson) – 2:14
"Walls Instead of Bridges" (Barbara Shockley) – 2:59
"I Feel Better All Over" (Ken Rogers, Leon Smith) – 2:33

Side B
"Burning" (Jerry Foster, Bill Rice) – 2:39
"Good News" (Rory Bourke) – 2:43
"Ghost Story" (Joe Allen) – 2:34
"A Touch of Yesterday" (Dallas Frazier, A.L. "Doodle" Owens) – 2:14
"Gone" (Smokey Rogers)  – 2:13

Musicians
Hargus "Pig" Robbins, Ron Oats - piano
Buddy Harman, Jim Isbell - drums
Billy Linneman, Jack Williams - bass guitar
Weldon Myrick, Jeff Newman - steel guitar
Dave Kirby, Grady Martin - electric guitar
Ray Edenton, Bobby Thompson, Jim Colvard, Jimmy Capps - rhythm guitar
Harold Bradley, Tommy Allsup, Kelso Herston - electric bass guitar
Buddy Spicher, Shorty Lavender, Johnny Gimble - fiddle
Farrell Morris - percussion

Background Vocals
The Jordanaires (Hoyt Hawkins, Neal Matthews, Jr., Gordon Stoker, Ray Walker)
The Nashville Sound (Louis Nunley, Dotty Dillard, Gil Wright, Jeannine Walker, Ernest West)
Marvin Husky

Production
Producer: Don Grant
Recorded at: Woodland Sound Studio, Nashville, Tennessee
Mixing Engineer: Rex Collier
Mastering Engineer: Bob Sowell
Album Photography: Ken Kim

References

1974 albums
Ferlin Husky albums
ABC Records albums